The 78th Infantry Division (German: 78. Infanterie-Division), later the 78th Sturm (Assault) Division, was a German infantry formation which fought during World War II.

Unit history 
The 78th Infantry Division was raised in August 1939 in Stuttgart, incorporating reservists from Baden-Württemberg (its divisional symbol was a representation of Ulm Minster).

It was stationed in France for occupation duties from the summer of 1940 through the spring of 1941, and then transferred east to participate in Operation Barbarossa with Army Group Centre. The division advanced from the Polish border to the gates of Moscow, being halted on 3 December 1941 by the Soviet defences. By January 7, 1942, the division had been pushed back from Ruza to Gzhatsk where the Soviet winter offensive was halted. The division then formed the South East flank of the Rzhev-Vyazma Salient. Late in 1942 it suffered heavy losses in the Rzhev battles.

At the beginning of 1943 it was reorganised as the 78th Sturm Division (a new divisional symbol, an armoured fist, being adopted, derived from the artificial hand of Götz von Berlichingen) with additional adjustments to its strength and organisation over the next several months. Each of its three infantry regiments was redesignated as a Sturm-Regiment. The designation Sturm (assault) reflected the division's increased strength, which eventually included subordinate Sturmgeschutz (assault gun) Heavy Mortar and Nebelwerfer (rocket launcher) battalions and a tank destroyer unit equipped with Marder IIs, as well as extra regimental artillery support. With its new organisation, the division took part in Operation Citadel as part of the XXIII Corps of the Ninth Army, being involved in the fighting at Ponyri. During the following Soviet Counteroffensive the division was first transferred from the Ninth Army to the Second Panzer Army in July, then again to the Fourth Army in September where the division was forced back to the Panther-Wotan line East of Orsha.

During the June - July 1944 Soviet offensive against Army Group Centre, Operation Bagration, the division was assigned to defend the main Moscow - Minsk road and the town of Orsha. During the fighting the division was destroyed, having failed to break out of an encirclement east of Minsk on the night of 5/6 July. Surviving elements were taken over by the 565th Volksgrenadier Division.

78th (Volks) Grenadier Division 
Later that month, the division was reconstituted as the 78th Grenadier Division, by renaming the 543rd Volksgrenadier Division then in the process of forming. In October 1944 it was renamed as 78th Volksgrenadier Division, and in early 1945 renamed again to 78th Volks-Sturm Division, being assigned to Army Group Centre. It was among the forces of the First Panzer Army pushed from Upper Silesia into Czechoslovakia, where its troops surrendered to the Soviets near Olomouc at the end of the war in May.

Commanding officers

Notes

References 
 
 

0*078
Military units and formations established in 1939
1939 establishments in Germany
Military units and formations disestablished in 1945